Lionel Eric Hayward (2 August 1917 – 1976) was an English professional footballer who played as a defender. He was the elder brother of Basil and Doug Hayward.

He began his career as an amateur at Port Vale in July 1934, before turning professional in 1936. He was never a first team regular, and was allowed to join Blackpool in May 1937. He remained at Bloomfield Road for the next 15 years, during one of the brightest periods in the club's history, and played twice at Wembley in the FA Cup final defeats of 1948 and 1951. In total he played 305 league games in the Football League, not including appearances during World War II.

Career
Hayward began his career with Port Vale as an amateur in July 1934, signing professional forms two years later. He made his debut at The Old Recreation Ground in a 1–0 defeat to Bury on 30 March 1935, and made four appearances in 1934–35 and 13 appearances in 1935–36. He continued to skirt the fringes of the first team as the "Valiants" were relegated from the Second Division into the Third Division North, featuring 21 times in 1936–37. He was transferred to Joe Smith's Blackpool in May 1937, with whom he would spend the next fifteen years.

He made his debut for the "Seasiders" on 27 November 1937, in a single-goal defeat by Liverpool at Bloomfield Road. He went on to make 23 further appearances during the 1937–38 season. He missed only one game of the 1938–39 campaign, before World War II intervened. During the hostilities he guested for Stoke City, Wolverhampton Wanderers, Wrexham, Walsall, Birmingham and Luton Town when he wasn't stationed with the Army in India. He also featured for Blackpool in the 1943 League War Cup Final victory over Arsenal. When the Football League resumed in a regional form in 1945–46, Hayward returned to his club.

In 1946–47, Hayward made 20 appearances. The following season, he missed only one game as Blackpool finished in the top ten in the First Division for a second consecutive season. He played in the 1948 FA Cup Final at Wembley, which ended in a 4–2 defeat to Matt Busby's Manchester United. He was an ever-present in 1948–49.

Hayward appeared in the first third of the 1949–50 campaign, before an injury ruled him out of the remaining fifteen games. In 1950–51, Hayward made 37 league appearances as Blackpool finished third, their highest-ever finishing place in the League at that point. Hayward also made his second appearance in an FA Cup Final; again, they were unsuccessful, losing 2–0 to Newcastle United. Hayward missed out on Blackpool's third – this time successful – attempt at winning the FA Cup by twelve months. He retired at the end of the 1951–52 season after making almost 300 league and cup appearances at the club.

Career statistics
Source:

Honours
Blackpool
Football League War Cup: 1943
FA Cup runner-up: 1948,  1951

References

Further reading
 

1917 births
1976 deaths
Sportspeople from Newcastle-under-Lyme
English footballers
Association football defenders
Port Vale F.C. players
Blackpool F.C. players
Stoke City F.C. wartime guest players
Wolverhampton Wanderers F.C. wartime guest players
Walsall F.C. wartime guest players
Wrexham F.C. wartime guest players
Birmingham City F.C. wartime guest players
Luton Town F.C. wartime guest players
English Football League players
British Army personnel of World War II
FA Cup Final players